Pseudokoleps is a genus of moths in the family Blastobasidae. It contains only one species, Pseudokoleps akainae, which is found in Costa Rica.

The length of the forewings is 3.9–4.8 mm. The forewings are brownish orange intermixed with a few brown scales. The hindwings are translucent brown.

Etymology
The generic name is formed from the Greek words pseud (meaning false) and koleps (meaning bent knee) and refers to the dissimilarity of Koleps and Pseudokoleps in genital characters despite sharing bifurcate apices of the ventral part of the valva. The specific name akainae is derived from Greek akaina (meaning thorn or spine) and refers to the downward pointed, thornlike proximal flange of the dorsal part of the valva.

References

Blastobasidae genera
Monotypic moth genera
Moths of Central America